Tragocephala mima is a species of beetle in the family Cerambycidae. It was described by James Thomson in 1878. It is known from Tanzania, Malawi, Zambia, Mozambique, Kenya, and Zimbabwe.

References

mima
Beetles described in 1878